Paul Fässler (13 June 1901 – 26 March 1983) was a Swiss association football player who competed in the 1924 Summer Olympics. He was a member of the Swiss team, which won the silver medal in the football tournament.

References

External links

 DatabaseOlympics.com profile

1901 births
1983 deaths
Swiss men's footballers
Footballers at the 1924 Summer Olympics
Footballers at the 1928 Summer Olympics
Olympic footballers of Switzerland
Olympic silver medalists for Switzerland
Switzerland international footballers
Olympic medalists in football
Medalists at the 1924 Summer Olympics
BSC Young Boys players
Association football defenders
FC Biel-Bienne players